Carl Jesper Benzelius (16 January 1714 – 2 January 1793) was a Swedish theologian, professor, bishop of the Diocese of Strängnäs from 1776 to 1793.

Biography 
Born in Uppsala to archbishop Erik Benzelius the younger, Benzelius was brought up at the home of his grandfather, Bishop Jesper Swedberg. He was then guided by his uncle Henric Benzelius at Lund University and graduated with his Master of Arts degree in 1738, after which he spent a few years in England, France and Holland. In 1741 he became a temporary priest of the royal court, receiving a permanent position in 1742.

Between 1743 and 1744, he again traveled abroad, and stayed particularly in Helmstedt, where he defended his dissertation under the famous Johann Lorenz von Mosheim, and became an honorary doctor of theology. In Berlin he presided over the marriage of Adolf Frederick of Sweden and Louisa Ulrika of Prussia and was and was accepted as Louisa Ulrika's teacher of the Swedish language. In 1750 he was called to Lund as professor of theology.

Benzelius was quiet and meek. He is portrayed as a more capable learned professor and being more appreciated as a friend and family man than being an apt head of a diocese. This, however, became his lot when he was appointed bishop of Strängnäs in 1776. He was a member of parliament in 1778 and 1786. In 1778 he became a member of Pro Fide et Christianismo, a Christian education society. Benzelius died in Strängnäs 2 January 1793.

References

See also
C. J. Benzelius, Dissertatio historico-theologica de Johanne Dvraeo, pacificatore celeberrimi maxime de actis eivs Svecanis qvam consensv venerandae Facultatis theologicae in illvstri Academia Ivlia praesidente magnifico prorectore Jo. Laurentio Moshemio [...] pro svmmis in Theologia Honoribvs conseqvendis in Ivleo Maiori [...] publicae censurae subjiciet Carolus Jesper Benzelius, Helmstadii, Typis P. Dieterici Schnorrii, 1744.

1714 births
1793 deaths
People from Uppsala
Lutheran bishops of Strängnäs
18th-century Lutheran bishops
Age of Liberty people